The Maweti–Guarani languages of Brazil form a branch of the Tupian language family according to 
Meira and Drude (2015). The branch was originally proposed by Rodrigues (1984), and is also accepted by Jolkesky (2016).

Classification
Maweti–Guarani
Mawe
Aweti–Guarani
Aweti
Tupi-Guarani

Proto-language

Reconstruction of Proto-Maweti–Guarani, along with Mawe, Aweti, and Proto-Tupi–Guarani cognates according to Meira and Drude (2015).

For a list of Proto-Maweti-Guarani reconstructions by Corrêa-da-Silva (2013), see the corresponding Portuguese article.

References

Mello, A. A. S. Estudo histórico da família lingüística Tupi-Guarani: aspectos fonológicos e lexicais. Ph.D. dissertation, Universidade Federal de Santa Catarina, Florianópolis, 2000.
Rodrigues, A. D.; Dietrich, W. On the linguistic relationship between Mawe and Tupi-Guarani. Diachronica, v. 14, n. 2, p. 265-304, 1997.

Tupian languages